Chesham (also Romanized as Cheshām; also known as Cheshm, Cheshom, and Chisham) is a village in Mehr Rural District, Bashtin District, Davarzan County, Razavi Khorasan Province, Iran. At the 2006 census, its population was 1,535, in 401 families.

References 

Populated places in Davarzan County